Göran Bengtsson (born 25 November 1949) is a Swedish long-distance runner. He competed in the marathon at the 1976 Summer Olympics.

References

External links
 

1949 births
Living people
Athletes (track and field) at the 1976 Summer Olympics
Swedish male long-distance runners
Swedish male marathon runners
Olympic athletes of Sweden
Athletes from Gothenburg
20th-century Swedish people